Merikoi to protimoun kryo translations: Some Like it Cool is a 1963 Greek comedy film directed by Giannis Dalianidis.  Lakis (Dinos Iliopoulos), Rena (Rena Vlachopoulou), Eva (Zoi Laskari) and Mary (Chloi Liaskou) are four siblings that were secretly in relationships  with Lela (Martha Karagianni), Thodoros (Giannis Vogiatzis), Giorgis (Vangelis Voulgaridis) and Kleopa (Kostas Voutsas), respectively.

Plot

Lakis has three sisters, two younger and one older, which have to be married before he can marry his girlfriend Lela. On a summer excursion, the younger ones meet two boys and begin an affair. Unaware to that, their elderly father tries to find a suitor for his older daughter Rena.

Cast

Rena Vlachopoulou .... Rena Angelou
Giannis Vogiatzis .... Thodoros
Vangelis Voulgaridis .... Giorgos
Kostas Voutsas .... Kleopas
Joly Garbi .... mother Angelou
Kostas Doukas .... father Angelou
Dinos Iliopoulos .... Lakis Angelou
Martha Karagianni .... Lela
Zoi Laskari .... Eva Angelou
Chloi Liaskou .... Mary Angelou
Periklis Christoforidis .... Fedon
Giorgos Konstantinou .... Tryfon
Nikitas Platis .... Thanasis Nikolaidis
Dimitris Kallivokas .... Lakis's colleague
Alekos Tzanetakos .... young man

Trivia

The movie made 212,247 tickets.

It was Giannis Dalianidis' first musical
Finos Films mainly did not want to star Rena Vlachopoulou in a cast that she did not made a trade, her talent that opened her great career
The title of the movie comes from the opposite form of an American movie Some Like it Hot

External links

Some Like it Cool at cine.gr

1963 comedy films
1960s Greek-language films
1963 films
Finos Film films
Greek comedy films
Films directed by Giannis Dalianidis